Warna 94.2FM is a Malay language contemporary music radio station operated by Mediacorp. It broadcasts Malay hits and provides an Islamic General Service for Singapore. It is one of the nation's oldest stations, tracing its origins back to the beginning of regulated radio broadcasting in Singapore/Straits Settlements along with Gold 905, Capital 95.8FM and Oli 96.8FM on 1 June 1936.

The programmes on Warna 942 as of 2023 include Espresso Warna with AB Shaik and Mariam Mas'od on mornings,Warna Vista with Aura Shai on lunchtime,Zon Warna Petang with Noreha Bajuri on afternoons,Dimanika Warna with RZ and TG in the evenings and Warna Kejora with Suriani Kassim on overnight.

It provides Malay Islamic, news and information programs and broadcasts Malay nostalgic songs.

The station changed brandings several times until 23 November 1991 where the station gained its current name as Warna (the Malay language word for colour).

It is currently Singapore's #1 Malay radio station, according to the latest Nielsen Radio Survey as of 22 December 2020.

Directorial & Management
 Senior Programme Director : Morniyati Tukimin
 Music Director : Elfie rafie

News Bulletins
News bulletins for the station are provided by Mediacorp's Malay newsroom (Bilik Berita) division. The news was delivered every hour between morning and primetime slots of the day (airs between 7:00am and 10:00pm daily) but in mid 2018, the Bilik Berita division adjusted its news bulletins to air every hour between 7:00am and 7:30pm.

General Islamic service
The station is unique among all Singapore-based stations as it provides content to the Malay/Muslim community in Singapore.

Daily religious programming and Azan Solat broadcasts 
Every morning at 5:00 am, an automated religious programming is presented with pre-recorded studio continuity in between segments.

Mandatory programmes aired in the service include the following:

 Seruan Illahi
 Santapan Rohani
 Firman & Sabda
 Sinaran Al-Quran
 Kemusykilan
 Tazkirah
 Khutbah Jumaat

For five times a day, the prayer call or azan solat is played on the station at the assigned time calculated and deliberated by the Islamic Religious Council of Singapore (MUIS). Due to its time zone alignment with other UTC +8 countries since 1 January 1982, the Azan Subuh (Fajr) airs between 5:27 am and 5:59 am for Singapore (about 30 minutes ahead of its previous UTC+7:30 time zone); thus, instead of 6:00 am, Mediacorp prompted the Malay station to begin its broadcast day by playing the national anthem at 5:00 am to prevent overlapping with the call.

Khutbah broadcasts 
As the Singapore government promotes harmony between different religions, the actual solat portion on Fridays and Hari Raya prayer services, is banned for broadcasting across terrestrial radio and television channels based across the country. Instead, at around 6:30 pm, a recording of the Solat Juma'at service is broadcast on the station, to recap the Khutbah (sermon) of the Imam during the period. Yearly on Hari Raya Aidilfitri (1 Syawal) and Hari Raya Haji (10 Zulhijah), the station broadcasts the live Malay-language Khutbah immediately after the Takbir from a Masjid (mosque) at 8:00 am.

Special programming 
During the Maulidur Rasul holiday, the station airs Nasyid music dedicated to the Prophet Muhammad while also playing regular music at the same time, throughout the day.

See also
List of radio stations in Singapore
Asmah Laili

References

External links
Warna 94.2FM Official Website

1936 establishments in Singapore
Radio stations in Singapore
Radio stations established in 1936
Malay-language radio stations